Knivsta.Nu (KNU) is a local party in Knivsta municipality, Sweden. It was founded in 2002 and is currently third largest party in the municipal council. It has governed within both right-wing and left-wing coalitions and currently acts as Official Opposition to a ruling grand coalition. It is led by Lennart Lundberg. It is part of the Local parties of Uppsala County regional coalition.

Election results

References 

Swedish local political parties
Minor political parties in Sweden
2002 establishments in Sweden